Troxel is a surname. Notable people with the surname include:

Ed Troxel (1925–2001), American football coach
Gary Troxel, American singer, member of The Fleetwoods
Melanie Troxel, American drag racer

See also
Troxell